Titanoptilus stenodactylus is a moth in the family Pterophoridae first described by Thomas Bainbrigge Fletcher in 1911. It is known from South Africa, Tanzania, the Democratic Republic of the Congo and the Comoros.

References

External links

Pterophorinae
Lepidoptera of the Democratic Republic of the Congo
Moths of Sub-Saharan Africa
Moths of the Comoros
Lepidoptera of Tanzania
Lepidoptera of Zimbabwe